Peque is a village and municipality in the province of Zamora, part of the autonomous community of Castile and León, Spain. It has a population of approximately 200 inhabitants.

See also
 La Carballeda
 Kingdom of León
 Leonese language

References

Municipalities of the Province of Zamora